Hanover Township is one of ten townships in Jefferson County, Indiana, United States. As of the 2010 census, its population was 5,366 and it contained 2,055 housing units.

History
Thomas A. Hendricks Library on the campus of Hanover College was listed on the National Register of Historic Places in 1982.

Geography
The streams of Chain Mill Creek and Happy Valley Creek run through this township.

Cities and towns
 Hanover

Unincorporated towns
 Hanover Beach

Extinct towns
 Antioch Grange

Adjacent townships
 Madison Township (northeast)
 Saluda Township (south)
 Republican Township (west)

Cemeteries
The township contains four cemeteries: Carmel, Greenbriar, Hanover and Old Bethel.

Major highways
  Indiana State Road 56
  Indiana State Road 62
  Indiana State Road 256
  Indiana State Road 356

References
 
 United States Census Bureau cartographic boundary files

External links
 Indiana Township Association
 United Township Association of Indiana

Townships in Jefferson County, Indiana
Townships in Indiana